Davina Michel (born 27 December 1997) is a French boxer. She participated at the 2014 Summer Youth Olympics in the boxing competition, winning no medal. Michel participated at the 2022 IBA Women's World Boxing Championships, being awarded the bronze medal in the middleweight event.

References

External links 

1997 births
Living people
Place of birth missing (living people)
French women boxers
Middleweight boxers
AIBA Women's World Boxing Championships medalists
Boxers at the 2014 Summer Youth Olympics
21st-century French women
20th-century French women